Issik Qaghan (Chinese: 乙息記可汗 Yǐxījì kěhàn; personal name: Ashina Keluo 阿史那科罗) was the second ruler of the Turkic Khaganate.

Name 
His name is reconstructible in Middle Chinese as *kʰuâ-lâ, which is transliterated as either non-Turkic *Kvara or Old Turkic Qara.

Rule 
During his brief rule, he defeated the Rouran khagan Yujiulü Dengzhu. He is recorded to have sent a tribute of 50,000 horses to Western Wei in May 553. He died the same year.

References 

Göktürk khagans
Ashina house of the Turkic Empire
6th-century Turkic people